Lisa Arie is an American author, motivational speaker, experiential designer, and entrepreneur.

Background
Arie was born in Bronxville, New York and holds a B.A. from Hampshire College. She is married to Jess Arie and resides in Dove Creek, Colorado.

She serves as a speaker at engagements including the World Innovation Convention in Cannes, School of New Ventures at Columbia University, and the Society of Fellows at The Aspen Institute. Arie has been featured in media outlets including The Huffington Post. She is also a Fortune 70 Leadership Thought Leader. Lisa Arie is the author of Crossing The Silly Bridge.

Early career
In her early career, Lisa Arie was an award-winning advertising executive in New York City working at DDB, GSD&M and The Richards Group. She produced the original Tom Bodett spots for Motel 6. The campaign itself won numerous national and international awards, and was selected by Advertising Age magazine as one of the Top 100 Advertising Campaigns of the Twentieth Century. In 1994, she became the Founder and CEO of both Beaucoup, an independent production department, and Talent Solutions, an independent business affairs department.

Vista Caballo
In 2005, Arie founded The Vista Caballo Experiential Learning Center on her 160-acre ranch in Dove Creek, Colorado. Described by Fast Co. magazine as the "CEO whisperer", Lisa Arie works with horses as the instinctive catalyst to fast-forward entrepreneurs, c-suite executives, directors, managers, team leaders and individuals striving for change.

Vista Caballo is a certified B Corporation.

Bibliography

References

External links
 Vista Caballo Official site
 Lisa Arie on The Huffington Post

Living people
People from Bronxville, New York
American advertising executives
Year of birth missing (living people)
Hampshire College alumni
Businesspeople from Colorado
People from Dolores County, Colorado
21st-century American businesswomen
21st-century American businesspeople